Deanolis iriocapna is a species of moth in the family Crambidae. It was described by Edward Meyrick in 1938 and is found on the island of Java.

The forewings are pale yellow, with a yellowish costa, a dark spot in both outer edges of the cell, and a reddish undulating margin along the termen. The hindwings are of the same pale yellow ground colour, and the anterior half of the termen exhibits a similar margin as found in the forewings.

References

Moths described in 1938
Odontiinae